Sinocyclocheilus maculatus is a species of ray-finned fish in the genus Sinocyclocheilus.

References 

maculatus
Fish described in 2000